The El Salvador–Honduras football rivalry is a sports rivalry between the El Salvador and Honduras national football teams. The rivalry between the two nations peaked in 1969 when both teams played each other in the 1970 FIFA World Cup qualifiers, and the matches they played between each other, which ultimately saw El Salvador advance to the 1970 FIFA World Cup, were a contributing factor which led to the outbreak of the Football War in July 1969.

History 

The national teams of El Salvador and Honduras were both established in 1921 and played their first matches in the Independence Centenary Games hosted in Guatemala City, however, El Salvador was defeated 0–7 by Costa Rica and Honduras was defeated 0–9 by Guatemala, and as a result, neither team faced each other during the tournament.

El Salvador and Honduras first played each other on 7 November 1928 in Tegucigalpa, in which Honduras won 1–0. The teams rematched the following day, which ended in a 0–0 draw. El Salvador's first victory came in their next match in San Salvador, where the Salvadorans defeated the Hondurans by a score of 5–0. The 5-score margin of victory remains the largest margin of victory ever between the two teams, and the feat was repeated in 2000 when Honduras defeated El Salvador 5–0 during the 2002 FIFA World Cup qualifiers. El Salvador had never beaten Honduras in Honduran soil until 2022, when El Salvador gained their first ever win to Honduras away in the 2022 FIFA World Cup qualification.

Football War 

The two teams met during the 1970 FIFA World Cup qualifiers, the first time the two teams ever met in a tournament organized by FIFA. The teams played the first match in Tegucigalpa on 8 June 1969, in which Honduras won 1–0, which led to riots instigated by Salvadoran fans. In the second match in San Salvador on 15 June 1969, El Salvador won by a score of 3–0, and before the match, a rag was flown instead of the flag of Honduras. Honduran player Enrique Cardona stated that the Hondurans were "lucky that we lost" because otherwise "we wouldn't be alive today." The loss led to Hondurans attacking Salvadorans and burning down their homes, forcing many Salvadorans to flee back to El Salvador.

As both teams ended on equal points, a third match was played in neutral territory in Mexico City. El Salvador eventually won the match 3–2 after extra time. Before the match and because of the attacks against Salvadorans by Hondurans, the Salvadoran government severed diplomatic relations with Honduras on 26 June 1969, and on 14 July 1969, the Armed Forces of El Salvador invaded Honduras, beginning the Football War. After four days of fighting, the Organization of American States (OAS) negotiated a cease fire, ending the war after around 3,000 people, mostly civilians, had died. El Salvador withdrew its soldiers on 2 August 1969.

El Salvador qualified for the 1970 FIFA World Cup after defeating Haiti, however, the team would lose all three of its matches against Mexico, the Soviet Union, and Belgium in the group stage, failing to score a single goal.

Major tournament matches

1946 CCCF Championship

1953 CCCF Championship

1955 CCCF Championship

1961 CCCF Championship

1963 CONCACAF Championship

1970 FIFA World Cup qualifiers

1981 CONCACAF Championship

1985 CONCACAF Championship

2013 CONCACAF Gold Cup

2019 CONCACAF Gold Cup

List of matches 

The following is a list of matches played between El Salvador and Honduras since their first meeting in November 1927.

Head-to-head 

 As of 30 January 2022

Statistics

Overall 

a – includes qualification from 1965 and 1981

Individual results at the FIFA World Cup

See also 

 List of association football rivalries

References

Citations

Bibliography 

El Salvador national football team rivalries
Honduras national football team rivalries
El Salvador–Honduras relations
International association football rivalries